Liam "Ronnie"  Cooper (born ) is a professional rugby league footballer who plays as a  forward for Swinton Lions in the RFL Championship.

Playing career

St Helens
He was contracted to St Helens in the Super League, and spent time on loan from the Saints at the Sheffield Eagles and Halifax in the Championship and Whitehaven in Betfred League 1.

Widnes Vikings
On 19 August 2020 it was announced that Cooper would be leaving Widnes at the end of the 2020 season

Whitehaven R.L.F.C.
On 5 Sep 2020 it was reported that he had signed for Whitehaven R.L.F.C. in the RFL Championship

Swinton Lions
On 1 November 2022 it was announced that Cooper had signed for the Swinton Lions.

References

External links
St Helens profile

1996 births
Living people
Halifax R.L.F.C. players
Rugby league second-rows
Sheffield Eagles players
St Helens R.F.C. players
Swinton Lions players
Whitehaven R.L.F.C. players
Widnes Vikings players